Kunnathur (Kunnattūr,കുന്നത്തൂർ) is a taluk in Kollam district in the Indian state of Kerala.

The capital of Kunnathur taluk is Sasthamkotta. The major portion of Kerala's largest freshwater lake, Sasthamcotta Lake, is in Kunnathur. The Kallada River flows eastward within Kunnathur near the Kokkamkave Durga Devi Temple. It is within the border of the Kollam district and borders the Pathanamthitta district. Kunnathur is the smallest taluk in Kerala. Kovoor Kunjumon of RSP(L) is the present elected member from Kunnathur assembly constituency

References

Politics of Kollam district
Villages in Kollam district